The European Ladies' Team Championship is a European amateur team golf championship for women organised by the European Golf Association. The inaugural event was held in 1959. 

It was played in odd-numbered years from 1959 to 2007 and has been played annually since 2008 (with the exception of 2012).

Format
Currently, the championship is contested by up to 20 teams, each of 6 players.

The format consists of two rounds of strokeplay, out of which the five lowest scores from each team's six players will count each day. The total addition of the five lowest scores will constitute the team's score and determine the teams qualified for the last three rounds of matchplay. Only teams in contention for a medal will play a match format of two foursomes and five singles, while the other teams will play a one foursome and four singles match format.

Results

Winning nations' summary

Source:

Winning teams
2022: England: Charlotte Heath, Amelia Williamson, Caley McGinty, Lottie Woad, Rosie Belsham
2021: England: Lianna Bailey, Rosie Belsham, Annabell Fuller, Charlotte Heath, Caley McGinty, Emily Toy
2020: Sweden: Linn Grant, Ingrid Lindblad, Maja Stark, Beatrice Wallin
2019: Sweden: Linn Grant, Frida Kinhult, Sara Kjellker, Ingrid Lindblad, Maja Stark, Beatrice Wallin
2018: Sweden: Linn Grant, Frida Kinhult, Sara Kjellker, Amanda Linnér, Maja Stark, Beatrice Wallin
2017: England: Lianna Bailey, Gemma Clews, India Clyburn, Alice Hewson, Sophie Lamb, Rochelle Morris
2016: England: Emma Allen, Alice Hewson, Bronte Law, Meghan MacLaren, Elisabeth Prior, Olivia Winning
2015: France: Shannon Aubert, Mathilda Cappeliez, Justine Dreher, Manon Gidali, Ines Lescudier, Marion Veysseyre
2014: France: Shannon Aubert, Alexandra Bonetti, Céline Boutier, Emma Broze, Anaelle Carnet, Justine Dreher
2013: Spain: Natalia Escuriola, Camilla Hedberg, Noemí Jiménez, Marta Sanz, Patricia Sanz, Luna Sobrón
2011: Sweden: Madelene Sagström, Daniela Holmqvist, Nathalie Månsson, Amanda Sträng, Josephine Janson, Johanna Tillström
2010: Sweden: Caroline Hedwall, Camilla Lennarth, Louise Larsson, Jacqueline Hedwall, Nathalie Månsson, Amanda Sträng
2009: Germany: Pia Halbig, Thea Hoffmeister, Lara Katzy, Staphanie Kirchmaier, Caroline Masson, Nicola Rössler
2008: Sweden: Anna Nordqvist, Caroline Hedwall, Jacqueline Hedwall, Caroline Westrup, Pernilla Lindberg, Camilla Lennarth
2007: Spain: Azahara Muñoz, Carlota Ciganda, Emma Cabrera-Bello, Araseli Felgueroso, Carmen Perez-Narbon, Belén Mozo
2005: Spain: Emma Cabrera-Bello, Tania Elósegui, María Hernández, Lucia Mar, Belén Mozo, Adriana Zwank
2003: Spain: Carmen Alonso, Nuria Clau, Tania Elósegui, María Hernández, Elisia Serramiá, Adriana Zwank
2001: Sweden: Kristina Engström, Anna Gertsson, Mikaela Parmlid, Nina Reis, Helena Svensson, Linda Wessberg
1999: France: Maitena Alsuguren, Stéphanie Arricau, Virginie Auffret, Karine Icher, Marine Monnet, Gwladys Nocera
1997: Sweden: Susanna Berglund, Susanne Gillemo, Marie Hedberg, Ulrica Jidflo, Jessica Lindbergh, Isabelle Rosberg
1995: Spain: Alejandra Armas, Sara Beautell, Izlar Elguezabal, Ana Larraneta, Maria José Pons, Ana Belen Sanchez
1993: England: Sarah Burnell, Nicola Buxton, Julie Hall, Joanne Morley, Kirsty Speak, Lisa Walton
1991: England: Nicola Buxton, Fiona Edmond, Linzi Fletcher, Caroline Hall, Julie Hall, Joanne Morley
1989: France: Delphine Bourson, Caroline Bourtayre, Sophie Louapre, Cécilia Mourgue d'Algue, Sandrine Mendiburu, Valérie Pamard
1987: Sweden: Helen Alfredsson, Margareta Bjurö, Eva Dahlöf, Sofia Grönberg, Helene Koch, Malin Landehag
1985: England: Linda Bayman, Trish Johnson, Susan Moorcraft, Carole Swallow, Jill Thornhill, Claire Waite
1983: Ireland: Claire Hourihane, Philomena Wickham, Mary McKenna, Eavan Higgins, Maureen Madill
1981: Sweden: Hillevi Hagström, Viveca Hoff, Gisela Linnér, Charlotte Montgomery, Pia Nilsson, Liv Wollin
1979: Ireland: Rona Hegarty, Mary Gorry, Susan Gorman, Maureen Madill, Mary McKenna, Claire Nesbitt
1977: England: Mary Everard, Julia Greenhalgh, Dinah Henson, Beverly Huke, Vanessa Marvin, Angela Uzielli
1975: France: Martine Cochet, Odile Garaialde, Martine Giraud, Catherine Lacoste de Prado, Anne Marie Palli, Marie-Christine Ubald-Bocquet
1973: England: Linda Denison-Pender, Mary Everard, Ann Irvin, Carol le Feuvre, Mickey Walker
1971: England: Sally Barber, Mary Everard, Julia Greenhalgh, Ann Irvin, Dinah Oxley, Mickey Walker
1969: France: Odile Garaialde, Catherine Lacoste, Martine Giraud, Florence du Pasquier Mourgue d'Algue, Brigitte Varangot
1967: England: Vivien Saunders, Ann Irvin, Mary Everard, Sarah German, Liz Chadwick
1965: England: Ann Irvin, Marley Spearman, Susan Armitage, Ruth Porter, Jill Thornhill
1963: Belgium: Juliette de Schutter, Josyane Leysen, J. Vivario, Arlette Engel-Jacquet, Louise Van den Berghe
1961: France: Claudine Cros, Martine Gajan, M Mahé, Lally Segard, Brigitte Varangot
1959: France: Claudine Cros, Odile Garaialde, Lally Segard, Martine Paul, Brigitte Varangot

Sources:

See also
Espirito Santo Trophy – biennial world amateur team golf championship for women organized by the International Golf Federation.
European Ladies Amateur Championship – individual golf championship organized by the European Golf Association.
European Amateur Team Championship – amateur team golf championship for men organized by the European Golf Association.

References

External links
European Golf Association: Full results

 
Amateur golf tournaments
Team golf tournaments
Women's golf tournaments
Recurring sporting events established in 1959
Golf tournaments in Europe